Alister Ernest Hopkinson (30 May 1941 – 17 January 1999) was a New Zealand rugby union player. A prop, Hopkinson represented South Canterbury and Canterbury at a provincial level, and was a member of the New Zealand national side, the All Blacks, from 1967 to 1970. He played 35 matches for the All Blacks including nine internationals. He went on to coach the Canterbury team in 1992. Hopkinson died of cancer in 1999.

References

1941 births
1999 deaths
People from Mosgiel
People educated at South Otago High School
New Zealand rugby union players
New Zealand international rugby union players
South Canterbury rugby union players
Canterbury rugby union players
Rugby union props
New Zealand stock and station agents
Deaths from cancer in New Zealand
Rugby union players from Otago